Oscar Martin "Ossie" Solem (December 13, 1891 – October 26, 1970) was an American football player, coach of football and basketball, and college athletics administrator. He served as the head football coach at Luther College in Decorah, Iowa (1920), Drake University (1921–1931), the University of Iowa (1932–1936), Syracuse University (1937–1945), and Springfield College (1946–1957), compiling a career college football record of 162–117–20. From 1913 until 1920, Solem was the head coach of the Minneapolis Marines, prior to that team's entry into the National Football League (NFL). During his time with the Marines, Solem introduced the team to the single-wing formation, developed by the famed coach, Pop Warner, and used by the University of Minnesota, where Solem had played football. Solem was also the head basketball coach at Drake University for four seasons, from 1921 to 1925, tallying a mark of 37–31.

Playing and early coaching career
Solem played end at the University of Minnesota for Henry L. Williams from 1910 to 1912. He then began his coaching career, coaching for a pre-National Football League (NFL) professional football franchise called the Minneapolis Marines. He coached there for three years from 1913 to 1915 before coaching a few years of high school football at East Des Moines High School and South High School of Minneapolis.

Solem began his college coaching career at Luther College in 1920. After one year there, he was named head coach and athletic director at Drake University in Des Moines, Iowa in 1921. Solem served as Drake's head football coach and athletic director for 11 years from 1921 to 1931. From 1926 to 1931, he also served as the director of the Drake Relays.

Coaching career at Iowa
In 1932, Solem signed a three-year contract to succeed Burt Ingwersen as the 13th head football coach at the University of Iowa. He took over an Iowa football program that had recently been suspended from athletic competition in the Big Ten Conference for a month. More importantly, the Hawkeye program was suffering from the effects of the Great Depression. Since Iowa was a predominantly agricultural state, the Depression hit the Hawkeye athletic program particularly hard. The school could not even afford to pay Solem his full salary when he was first hired.

After winning the opening game of the 1932 season, Iowa lost their final seven games of the year. In the off-season, Solem loudly complained that athletes were being discriminated against in Iowa City and were not being hired for normal student jobs, probably as a result of Iowa's recent conference suspension. An independent investigator substantiated Solem's claims.

Hopes were not high in 1933, but Iowa responded with a 5–3 final record and Hawkeyes quarterback Joe Laws was named the Big Ten MVP. Solem's contract was extended two years, and with the departure of Iowa's athletic director, Solem was appointed to that position as well. Meanwhile, he struggled with a lack of cooperation from fellow Big Ten schools in schedule meetings. Each conference member was supposed to be guaranteed five conference games, but due to Iowa's recent suspension, other Big Ten schools were more accommodating to Notre Dame, a non-conference school, than they were to the Hawkeyes. Solem fought tirelessly to have Iowa regarded as a member of equal standing within the conference.

After two season opening wins, Iowa failed to win any of its final six games in 1934, and a season that started optimistically ended with a 2–5–1 record. Iowa managed to bounce back the following year with a respectable 4–2–2 record in 1935 behind the play of captain Dick Crayne and the sensational Ozzie Simmons. After the 1935 season, Solem worked with the president of the university at the time to improve the job situation for athletes in Iowa City. Their reforms helped Solem bring in what Solem called "the finest group of freshmen during my tenure". Many of the athletes Solem successfully recruited to Iowa would become the foundation for the 1939 Hawkeye team, nicknamed the "Ironmen", which included Nile Kinnick and Erwin Prasse.

A conflict between Solem and Ozzie Simmons overshadowed the 1936 season, which ended in a 3–4–1 record. After a 52–0 loss to Minnesota, Simmons quit the team for a couple days. Simmons stated that he felt Solem had been too critical of him for Iowa's failures during the 1936 season. Simmons was convinced to return to the team a few days later.

Before the final game of the season, reports were heard that Solem was leaving at the end of the year. Iowa defeated a heavily favored, nationally ranked Temple team, coached by Pop Warner, 25–0, to end Solem's coaching career at Iowa. After the 1936 season, Solem announced he was leaving Iowa for Syracuse University.

Later, Solem wrote, "I went down to Iowa City for the Iowa-Minnesota game, the first time I had been on the campus since the year after we left Iowa. As I sat there watching the game and admiring the beauty and growth of the campus, recalling the many friends we had in that lovely town, I could not bring myself to have any feeling of dislike or hate, but rather a feeling of regret...and gratefulness for having once been a part of that great institution."

Later coaching career
Solem coached at Syracuse from 1937 to 1945. During his time at Syracuse, he tutored a young assistant coach named Bud Wilkinson, who went on to coach the Oklahoma Sooners and win three national championships. After his time with the Orange, he coached at Springfield College in Massachusetts from 1946 to 1957, compiling a 58–33–7 record. Solem coached a total of 37 seasons of college football, with a combined record of 162–117–20 at five schools.

Death and legacy
Solem died at a hospital in Minneapolis, Minnesota on October 26, 1970.

One of his former players said about Solem, "He was a better offensive coach than he was a defensive coach...He was a fine, clean living man, and he was very well thought of in athletic circles." Former player Ozzie Simmons remarked, "He probably could have been tougher (on the players), but he was the finest gentleman I've ever been around."

Head coaching record

Professional football

College football

References

External links
 

1891 births
1950 deaths
American football ends
Drake Bulldogs athletic directors
Drake Bulldogs football coaches
Drake Bulldogs men's basketball coaches
Iowa Hawkeyes athletic directors
Iowa Hawkeyes football coaches
Luther Norse football coaches
Minneapolis Marines coaches
Minnesota Golden Gophers football players
Springfield Pride football coaches
Syracuse Orange football coaches
High school football coaches in Iowa
High school football coaches in Minnesota
United States Army officers
United States Army personnel of World War I
United States Army personnel of World War II
South High School (Minnesota) alumni
Sportspeople from Minneapolis
Coaches of American football from Minnesota
Players of American football from Minneapolis
Basketball coaches from Minnesota
Educators from Minnesota
American people of Norwegian descent
Sports coaches from Minneapolis